Rajputana College is a school located in Pratappur, Kashipur. Around 900 students attend the school, which is affiliated with Central Board of Secondary Education New Delhi. It has an intermediate college and high school for senior students.

The school is well connected to Ramnagar, nearby the city of Kashipur, as well by school bus facility.

House system
The school is divided into four houses. Each student is assigned a house at the start of his time in the school and will remain in that house for the whole of their school career.

The houses are:

External links
 

High schools and secondary schools in Uttarakhand
Education in Udham Singh Nagar district
Educational institutions in India with year of establishment missing